Lajos Koltai, ASC, HSC,  (born 2 April 1946) is a Hungarian cinematographer and film director best known for his work with legendary Hungarian director István Szabó, and Italian filmmaker Giuseppe Tornatore.  He was nominated for an Academy Award in 2000 for his work on the film Malèna.

Early years and career
Born at the beginning of the Cold War, he became interested in film at a very young age, though in Hungary at the time, film containing subversive content was heavily censored.  He shot his first short on a Super 8 film camera at the age of 14 and began to draft short scripts and turn them into movies starring friends and family.  One year he won first and second prizes at a local amateur film festival, and coincidentally another young filmmaker, István Szabó, was the head of the jury.  Koltai graduated from the School of Drama and Film in Budapest, a school known for nurturing such legends as Vilmos Zsigmond and László Kovács.

Collaboration with István Szabó
Still early in his career he gained international recognition during his collaborations with Szabó, namely his film Mephisto, which won the Academy Award for Best Foreign Language Film, and the cult political classic "Angi Vera" by Pal Gabor.  At this point the international film community was starting to take notice of these Eastern European films.  While Hollywood was at the peak of creativity a decade before after several decades of turning out films that didn't face the same restrictions as in these parts of the world, the Hungarian artistic spirit was beginning to find its place in the world, and many Hungarian directors were confronting truths about their country's tainted Nazi-affiliated history .  What followed was several artistic and political masterpieces, the teen-oriented Time Stands Still (1982), a film many considered to be well ahead of its time, Cannes Film Festival winner Colonel Redl (1985), which garnered yet another Oscar nomination, and Hanussen, another political drama loosely based on the rise of Hitler.

In 1995 at the 19th Moscow International Film Festival he won the Special Silver St. George for the Director of Photography for his work on the film Mario and the Magician.

Work in Hollywood
Around this time Koltai decided to make the move to the United States, a dramatic departure for any European filmmaker, let alone cinematographer, though clearly many opportunities lied in the Hollywood playing field.  So he joined the American Society of Cinematographers (ASC) and began to compile an impressive body of work, notably Luis Mandoki's White Palace, Wrestling Ernest Hemingway, Born Yesterday, When a Man Loves a Woman, Just Cause, Jodie Foster's Home for the Holidays, and Jack Lemmon and Walter Matthau's last film together Out to Sea.  While none of these films had a particularly signature or even beautiful style (save perhaps Mandoki's White Palace), due to the cookie-cutter industry standards Hollywood notoriously places over artistic license, it was around this time that another fateful collaboration took place, and that would be with Giuseppe Tornatore, the legendary director of Cinema Paradiso.  The Legend of 1900 would be their first film together, a story about a piano player who was born and raised on a steam boat.  Tornatore brought out some of Koltai's best work by allowing an actual creative collaboration to take place on set, instead of the cinematographer just taking orders from the director, and the result is what many (including Koltai himself) consider to be his most beautiful work.  This led to a career high for any cinematographer, being nominated for an Academy Award for Tornatore's sweeping love story Malèna in 2000.

Fateless
In 2004 Koltai directed his first film, the Holocaust drama Fateless (Sorstalanság), based on the novel by the same name by Nobel Prize winning writer Imre Kertész. It was released in Hungary in February 2005 with moderate success and it was released in the United States in the fall of 2005. It has had much exposure and success on the film festival circuit premiering at the Telluride Film Festival, Karlovy Vary International Film Festival, Chicago Film Festival, the Los Angeles Film Festival, the Washington Jewish Film Festival, The Boston Jewish Film Festival, the Toronto International Film Festival, the Woodstock Film Festival, the Berlinale, or Berlin Film Festival, where it was nominated for the prestigious Golden Berlin Bear, and countless others. It was also nominated for Best Score (Ennio Morricone) and Best Cinematography (Gyula Pados) at the European Film Awards, and Hungary nominated it for the 2006 Academy Awards, but out of the list of 58 countries as potential nominees for Best Foreign Film, it didn't make it to the final five.

Recent work
As of 15 February 2006:  Koltai finalized his first American directing deal for Focus Features, on the film Evening, scripted by Susan Minot (Stealing Beauty) and Michael Cunningham (The Hours).  Shooting took place summer 2006 in Rhode Island.  Actresses Claire Danes, Toni Collette, Vanessa Redgrave and Meryl Streep star in the movie.

Koltai's next projects are Aline & Wolfe, and Spider Dance. The former, which is scheduled to commence principal photography in 2009, tells the story of American writer Thomas Wolfe (1900–1938, Look Homeward, Angel) and his tumultuous affair with the much older and married arts patron and Broadway set designer Aline Bernstein, who is credited with inspiring Wolfe's writing career. Spider Dance is based upon the life of Lola Montez; focusing on her travels in Australia and is set for release in Christmas 2010.

Filmography

As cinematographer (selected titles)
Bizalom (Confidence) (1980)
 The Green Bird (1980)
Mephisto (1981)
Time Stands Still (1982)
The Princess (1983)
Colonel Redl (1985)
Hanussen (1988)
White Palace (1990)
Meeting Venus (1991)
Born Yesterday (1993)
Wrestling Ernest Hemingway (1993)
When a Man Loves a Woman (1994)
Just Cause (1995)
Home for the Holidays (1995)
Out to Sea (1997)
The Legend of 1900 (1998)
Sunshine (1999)
Malèna (2000)
The Emperor's Club (2002)
Max (2002)
Being Julia (2004)

As director
Fateless (2005)
Evening (2007)

References

External links

1946 births
Living people
David di Donatello winners
European Film Award for Best Cinematographer winners
German-language film directors
Hungarian cinematographers